Sylvania Township is an inactive township in Scott County, in the U.S. state of Missouri.

Sylvania Township was erected in 1871, and so named on account of forestland (Latin: sylvania) within its borders.

References

Townships in Missouri
Townships in Scott County, Missouri